The 2022 Mid-American Conference men's basketball tournament was the postseason men's basketball tournament for the Mid-American Conference (MAC) held March 10–12, 2022. The entire tournament was played at Rocket Mortgage FieldHouse in Cleveland, Ohio. The tournament champion, the Akron Zips, received the conference's automatic bid to the 2022 NCAA tournament where they lost in the first round to UCLA.

Format
As with the 2021 tournament, only the top eight teams qualify. The winner of the tournament will receive the MAC's automatic bid to the 2022 NCAA tournament.

Venue
The 2022 MAC tournament is scheduled to be held at Rocket Mortgage FieldHouse for the 23rd consecutive season.  The venue, located in downtown Cleveland at One Center Court, is the home of the Cleveland Cavaliers of the National Basketball Association (NBA) and has a seating capacity for basketball of 19,432.

Seeds
Eight out of the 12 MAC teams qualified for the tournament. Teams were seeded by record within the conference, with a tiebreaker system to seed teams with identical conference records.

Schedule

* denotes overtime period

Bracket

All-Tournament Team
Tournament MVP – Enrique Freeman, Akron

See also
2022 MAC women's basketball tournament

References

External links

2022
Tournament
Basketball competitions in Cleveland
MAC men's basketball tournament
MAC men's basketball tournament
College sports tournaments in Ohio
2020s in Cleveland